Velmurugan Thangasamy Manohar (born 6 March 1960), professionally credited as Charle, is an Indian actor who works in Tamil cinema. He has acted in more than 800 Tamil films as a comedian and supporting actor. He was named after the English comedian Charlie Chaplin.

Biography
Charle completed his  degree in chemistry from G. V. N. College in Kovilpatti, Tamil Nadu. During his college days, he was known for histrionics and his uncanny ability to imitate Tamil actors like Sivaji Ganesan, Muthuraman and Nagesh. He is an avid entertainer, and a popular stage artist, while at this colcolharle started his career as a Staff Artist – Actor in Song & Drama Division of Ministry of Information and Broadcasting and moved on to perform more than 1000 dramas in six years. He was named Charlie and got introduced in the film Poikkal Kudhirai in the year 1982 by the director K. Balachander. He proved to be a versatile actor in comedy as well as character roles in Tamil, Telugu and Malayalam films; he dubbed his own voice for his role in the Malayalam film Hijack (1995). He has more than 800 films to his credit and has played a vital role in many films, including films produced by National Film Development Corporation of India. He is highly talented in miming, mono acting and anchoring in stage shows and has performed in various countries.

Charle holds a Master of Arts degree from Madurai Kamaraj University and Master of Philosophy degree from Karaikkudi Alagappa University. He submitted his dissertation for M.Phil in the title, "Contributions of Comedians in the growth of Tamil cinema – 1937 to 1967".

Charlie received PhD in Tamil in the topic "Humour in Tamil Cinema" from Tamil University, Thanjavur in October 2019. His guide was Professor K Ravindran, former Head of the Drama department, Tamil University.

Awards

Tamil Nadu State Government Award
Film Fans Association, Chennai
Best Comedian Award – 1994– 2 times
Best Character Artiste Award – 1996
Bharath Social & Cultural Academy, Chennai
Best Comedian Award – 1998, 1999, 2000 & 2001– 4 times
Kalaimamani Award 2004
Kalaichchigaram Award 2018

Partial filmography
Actor

 Lottery Ticket (1982)
 Anney Anney (1983)
 Poikkal Kudhirai (1983)
 Achamillai Achamillai (1984)
 Enakkul Oruvan (1984)
 Poovilangu (1984)
 Pudhiavan (1984)
 Kalyana Agathigal (1985)
 Ilam Kandru (1985)
 Janani (1985)
 Naam Iruvar (1985)
 Thiramai (1985)
 Odangal (1986)
 Pudhiya Poovidhu (1986)
 Vidinja Kalyanam (1986)
 Yaaro Ezhuthiya Kavithai (1986)
 Uyire Unakkaga (1986)
 Thazhuvatha Kaigal (1986)
 Sigappu Malargal (1986)
 Punnagai Mannan (1986)
 Natpu (1986)
 Mella Thirandhathu Kadhavu (1986)
 Dharma Pathini (1986)
 Cinema Cinema (1986)
 Aayiram Pookkal Malarattum (1986)
 Kodai Mazhai (1986)
 Aankalai Nambathey (1987)
 Arul Tharum Ayyappan (1987)
 Ivaloru Pournami (1987)
 Thulasi (1987)
 Thangachi (1987)
 Ondru Engal Jathiye (1987)
 Vanna Kanavugal (1987)
 Solvathellam Unmai (1987)
 Megam Karuththirukku (1987)
 Manathil Uruthi Vendum (1987)
 Poovizhi Vasalile (1987)
 Michael Raj (1987)
 Jallikattu (1987)
 Ananda Aradhanai (1987)
 Solla Thudikuthu Manasu (1988)
 Ullathil Nalla Ullam (1988)
 Kai Naattu (1988)
 Thambi Thanga Kambi (1988)
 Naan Sonnathey Sattam (1988)
 Nallavan (1988)
 Senthoora Poove (1988)
 Unnal Mudiyum Thambi (1988)
 Dharmathin Thalaivan (1988)
 Thai Paasam (1988)
 Manamagale Vaa (1988)
 Uzhaithu Vaazha Vendum (1988)
 Puthiya Vaanam (1988)
 Valadhu Kalai Vaithu Vaa (1989)
 Thangamani Rangamani (1989)
 Yogam Raja Yogam (1989)
 Varusham Padhinaaru (1989)
 Dharma Devan (1989)
 En Thangai (1989)
 Idhaya Dheepam (1989)
 Annanukku Jai (1989)
 Pudhu Pudhu Arthangal (1989)
 Sonthakkaran (1989)
 Ore Oru Gramathiley (1989)
 Thangamani Rangamani (1989)
 Nyaya Tharasu (1989)
 Manidhan Marivittan (1989)
 Siva (1989)
 Uthama Purushan (1989)
 Indrudu Chandrudu (1989, Telugu film)
 Raja Kaiya Vacha (1990)
 Pudhu Vasantham (1990)
 En Uyir Thozhan (1990)
 Idhaya Thamarai (1990)
 Sirayil Pootha Chinna Malar (1990)
 Pattanathil Petti (1990)
 Sakthi Parasakthi (1990)
 Keladi Kanmani (1990)
 Oru Veedu Iru Vasal (1990)
 Unnai Solli Kutramillai (1990)
 Ulagam Pirandhadhu Enakkaga (1990)
 Jagathalaprathapan (1990)
 Pudhu Pudhu Ragangal (1990)
 Vaigasi Poranthachu (1990)
 Mounam Sammadham (1990)
 Manaivi Oru Manickam (1990)
 Pengal Veettin Kangal (1990)
 Anjali (1990)
 Amma Pillai (1990)
 60 Naal 60 Nimidam (1990)
 Pudhu Padagan (1990)
 Inaindha Kaigal (1990)
Vasanthakala Paravai (1991)
 Gnana Paravai (1991)
 Chithirai Pookkal (1991)
 Pondatti Sonna Kettukanum (1991)
 Ponnukku Sethi Vanthachu (1991)
 MGR Nagaril (1991)
 Sir...I Love You (1991)
 Gopura Vasalile (1991)
 Thalapathi (1991)
 Azhagan (1991)
 Sigaram (1991)
 Devar Veettu Ponnu (1992)
 Nadodi Pattukkaran (1992)
 Brahmachari (1992)
 Mudhal Kural (1992)
 Vaaname Ellai (1992)
 Kaviya Thalaivan (1992)
 Chinna Pasanga Naanga (1992)
 Endrum Anbudan (1992)
 Onna Irukka Kathukanum (1992)
 Kasu Thangakasu (1992)
 Oor Panchayathu (1992)
 Uyiril Oru Raagam (1992)
 Singaravelan (1992)
 Kaaval Geetham (1992)
 Uzhaippali (1993)
 Uthama Raasa (1993)
 Thangakkili (1993)
 Mutrugai (1993)
 Maamiyar Veedu (1993)
 Pudhupiravi (1993)
 Pudhiya Thendral (1993)
 Purusha Lakshanam (1993)
 Parvathi Ennai Paradi (1993)
 Kilipetchu Ketkava (1993)
 Karpagam Vanthachu (1993)
 Karuppu Vellai (1993)
 Jathi Malli (1993)
 En Idhaya Rani (1993)
 Vedan (1993)
 Dasarathan (1993)
 Chinna Kannamma (1993)
 Amaravathi (1993)
 Airport (1993)
 Ulavaali (1994) 
 Veera (1994)
 Veeramani (1994)
 Vaa Magale Vaa (1994)
 Seevalaperi Pandi (1994) 
 Pudhusa Pootha Rosa (1994)
 Priyanka (1994)
 Thendral Varum Theru (1994)
 Duet (1994)
 Senthamizh Selvan (1994)
 Subramaniya Swamy (1994)
 Sakthivel (1994)
 Aakaya Pookkal (1995)
 Anbu Magan (1995)
 Oru Oorla Oru Rajakumari (1995)
 Valli Vara Pora (1995)
 Varraar Sandiyar (1995)
 Gandhi Pirantha Mann (1995)
 Rani Maharani (1995)
 Hijack (1995) (Malayalam)
 Aanazhagan (1995)
 Poove Unakkaga (1996)
 Thuraimugam (1996)
 Karuppu Roja (1996)
 Pudhu Nilavu (1996)
 Nattupura Pattu (1996)
 Kizhakku Mugam (1996)
 Karuvelam Pookkal (1996)
 Gopala Gopala (1996)
 Summa Irunga Machan (1996)
 Andha Naal (1996)
 Namma Ooru Raasa (1996)
 Kaalamellam Kaathiruppen (1997)
 Kaalamellam Kadhal Vaazhga (1997)
 Pongalo Pongal (1997)
 Pathini (1997)
 Pagaivan (1997)
 Kathirunda Kadhal (1997)
 Raman Abdullah (1997)
 Ettupatti Rasa (1997)
 Once More (1997)
 Adimai Changili (1997)
 Adhibathi (1997)
 Kadhalukku Mariyadhai (1997)
 Kaadhal Kavithai (1998)
 Ellame En Pondattidhan (1998)
 Ponmanam (1998)
 Unnudan (1998)
 Pooveli (1998)
 Thanga Magal (1998)
 Thaayin Manikodi (1998)
 Ninaithen Vandhai (1998)
 Nilaave Vaa (1998)
 Pudhumai Pithan (1998)
 Velai (1998)
 Amarkalam (1999)
 Time (1999)
 Aasaiyil Oru Kaditham (1999)
 Hello (1999)
 Sangamam (1999)
 Endrendrum Kadhal (1999)
 Suryodayam (1999)
 Kannupada Poguthaiya (1999)
 Kanave Kalaiyadhe (1999)
 Sundari Neeyum Sundaran Naanum (1999)
 Kannukkul Nilavu (2000)
 Unnai Kodu Ennai Tharuven (2000)
 Vetri Kodi Kattu (2000)
 Parthen Rasithen (2000)
 Karuvelam Pookkal (2000)
 Thenali (2000)
 Anbudan (2000)
 Ennavale (2000)
 Kadhal Rojavae (2000)
 Friends (2001)
 Piriyadha Varam Vendum (2001)
 Pandavar Bhoomi (2001)
 Alli Arjuna (2001)
 Veettoda Mappillai (2001)
 Chocolate (2001)
 Kasi (2001)
 Saptham (2002)
 Thamizh (2002)
 Thenkasi Pattanam (2002)
 Nanba Nanba (2002)
 Ezhumalai (2002)
 Unnai Ninaithu (2002)
 Red (2002)
 Gemini (2002)
 Junior Senior (2002)
 Pammal K. Sambandam (2002)
 Naina (2002)
 En Mana Vaanil (2002)
 Kadhaludan (2003)
 Sena (2003)
 Banda Paramasivam (2003)
 Alaudin (2002)
 Jay Jay (2003)
 Punnagai Poove (2003)
 Kovil (2004)
 Jananam (2004)
 Ramakrishna (2004)
 Ayya (2005)
 Girivalam (2005)
 Anniyan (2005)
 Mazhai (2005)
 Oru Kalluriyin Kathai (2005)
 Nenjirukkum Varai (2006)
 Thiruttu Payale (2006)
 Vel (2007)
 Thirumagan (2007)
 Sadhu Miranda (2008)
 Velli Thirai (2008)
 Ananda Thandavam (2009)
 Enga Raasi Nalla Raasi (2009)
 Mathiya Chennai (2009)
  Cheriya Kallanum Valiya Policeum (2010, Malayalam Film)
 Avargalum Ivargalum (2011)
 Venghai (2011)
 Unnil Tholaindhein (2011)
 Vilayada Vaa (2012)
 Ishtam (2012)
 Neram (2013)
 Desingu Raja (2013)
 Angusam (2014)
 Damaal Dumeel (2014)
 Jeeva (2014)
 Papanasam (2015)
 Idhu Enna Maayam (2015)
 Thakka Thakka (2015)
 Kirumi (2015)
 Urumeen (2015)
 Aarathu Sinam (2016)
 24 (2016) 
 Oru Naal Koothu (2016) 
 Enakku Innoru Per Irukku (2016) 
 Yaman (2017)
 Maanagaram (2017)
 Paambhu Sattai (2017)
 Kadhal Kasakuthaiya (2017)
 Oru Kanavu Pola (2017)
 Velaikkaran (2017)
 Kannakkol (2018)
 Pattinapakkam (2018)
 Vellai Pookal (2019)
 Bodhai Yeri Budhi Maari (2019)
 Gurkha (2019)
 Mei (2019)
 Dhanusu Raasi Neyargale (2019)
 Pizhai (2020)
 Walter (2020)
 Theerpugal Virkapadum (2021)
 Bro Daddy (2022, Malayalam film)
 Drama (2022)
 Aattral (2022)
 Udanpaal (2022)

Dubbing artist
 Shanmuga Pandian (1999) - MS Narayana
 Chutti Chathan (2010) - Ravi Vaswani and Jagadeesh

References

External links

Indian male film actors
Tamil male actors
Indian male comedians
Tamil comedians
Living people
Madurai Kamaraj University alumni
People from Thoothukudi district
1960 births